Superfiction is the fifth album by American rock band Cold. It was released on July 19, 2011 in the US and in the UK. This is Cold's first album since their reunion and six years since their previous release. Two singles were released; "Wicked World" and "American Dream".

Background 
While touring the band announced that at every show they would be recording their new song "Snowblind" and that the best performance would be included as a hidden track on the new album, this however turned out to be untrue as the retail versions only contain the original twelve songs proposed for the release. "The Crossroads" was originally titled "My Religion" during Cold's live shows before the album's release. "What Happens Now?" was written for a new Spider-Man movie and was initially titled "The Web". To the band's dismay, it was ultimately not chosen to be featured in the film. 

This is Cold's first album to be released on vinyl, the first album the band recorded as a four-piece since their 1998 debut, and their last album with members Jeremy Marshall and Zach Gilbert.

Commercial performance 
The album debuted at #37 on the Billboard 200, selling 11,000 copies in its first week. It dropped off the chart after two weeks.

Track listing
All songs written by Scooter Ward, except where noted.

Personnel
Scooter Ward – lead vocals, rhythm guitar, piano
Zach Gilbert – lead guitar
Jeremy Marshall – bass, backing vocals
Sam McCandless – drums

Charts

References

Cold (band) albums
2011 albums
Eleven Seven Label Group albums